The read-through, table-read, or table work is a stage of film, television, radio, and theatre production when an organized reading around a table of the screenplay or script by the actors with speaking parts is conducted.

In addition to the cast members with speaking parts, the read-through is usually attended by the principal financiers or studio executives, producers, heads of department, writers, and directors. It is generally attended only by people involved in the production. It is usually the first time everyone involved in the production will have gathered together and it is traditional for everyone to introduce themselves by both name and job. The director may then open proceedings by making a short speech outlining their aspirations for the project.

An additional professional actor not otherwise involved in the production may be hired to read the non-dialogue parts of the script such as scene headings and action. These parts of the script are usually edited down severely for the purposes of the read-through to keep the pace of the reading up.

In film
The read-through is an important milestone in the production of most films. It is a clear signal that all of the key elements, including cast, finance, and heads of department, are in place and that pre-production is almost complete. It is often the first time that the script has had a life beyond the written word, and it is also an opportunity for everyone involved in production to get at least a partial insight into the way the actors may approach their roles. In addition, a read-through is often a surprisingly  powerful tool for identifying problem areas in the script. Wooden dialogue, unbelievable situations, or boring sections of the film which have not been addressed during the script development process often become apparent during the read-through.

References

Further reading
So You Want to be a Theatre Director? (2004) by Stephen Unwin, 

Persistence of Vision: An Impractical Guide to Producing a Feature Film for Under $30,000 (1995), by John Gaspard, Dale Newton, Gaspard Newton, 

Friendly Enemies: Maximizing the Director-actor Relationship (2003), by Delia Salvi, 
 

Film production
Stage terminology
Television terminology